"Sorry Suzanne" is a 1969 single by the Hollies, co-written by Geoff Stephens and Tony Macaulay. It was the group's first song to feature Terry Sylvester in the place of Graham Nash. "Sorry Suzanne" was released with the B-side "Not That Way at All" on the Parlophone label (catalogue number R5765). The song reached number 3 on the UK singles chart in March 1969, number 1 in Switzerland on 22 April 1969, and number 56 on the Billboard Hot 100 in the US on May 31, 1969.

Chart history

Weekly charts

Year-end charts

Cover versions
The Glass Bottle covered "Sorry Suzanne" in 1979.

References

1969 songs
The Hollies songs
Parlophone singles
Songs written by Geoff Stephens
Songs written by Tony Macaulay
Epic Records singles
Number-one singles in South Africa
Number-one singles in Switzerland
1969 singles